Paracuellos del Jarama is a small town and municipality in the Community of Madrid, Spain. It is located northeast from Madrid and very close to Madrid-Barajas Airport. The etymology of the name is unclear.

In 1936, it (along with Torrejón de Ardoz) was the site of the Paracuellos massacres.

Transport

Urban lines 

 Line 1: Altos de Jarama urbanization - Miramadrid

 Line 2: Picón del cura - Los Berrocales urbanization 

 Line 3: Industrial estate - C.C. San Fernando

Interurban lines 

 210: San Sebastián de los Reyes (Infanta Sofía Hospital) - Paracuellos del Jarama 

 211: Madrid (Canillejas) - Paracuellos del Jarama

 212: Madrid (Canillejas) - Paracuellos del Jarama (Miramadrid)

 213: Madrid (Canillejas) - Belvis

 215: Torrejón de Ardoz - Paracuellos del Jarama

 256: Madrid (Canillejas) - Daganzo de Arriba - Valdeavero

 263: Madrid (Barajas) - Cobeña - Algete

References

Municipalities in the Community of Madrid